Lycomorphodes correbioides is a moth of the family Erebidae. It was described by Schaus in 1911. It is found in Costa Rica.

References

 Natural History Museum Lepidoptera generic names catalog

Cisthenina
Moths described in 1911